Clifford Prevost Grayson (July 14, 1857 – November 11, 1951) was an American painter and teacher.

Biography
He was born in Philadelphia, the youngest of the three sons of lawyer and newspaper editor Frederick William Grayson and Mary Mallett Prevost. Grayson graduated from the University of Pennsylvania in 1878, and studied at the Pennsylvania Academy of the Fine Arts under Christian Schussele and Thomas Eakins. He studied further at the École des Beaux-Arts in Paris under Jean-Léon Gérôme. After graduation, he joined the artist colonies at Pont Aven and Concarneau, and opened a studio in Paris. Grayson was a regular exhibitor at the Paris Salon during the 1880s.

Drexel Institute
Grayson returned to Philadelphia in 1890. He was hired as instructor in oil painting at the Drexel Institute of Art, Science and Industry in 1891, and promoted to director of the Art Department in 1893. Under Grayson, the art curriculum expanded from a 2-year to a 4-year program. He hired Howard Pyle as an instructor in 1894, in what became the School of Illustration. Grayson taught portraiture and life classes, and Charles Grafly taught clay modeling and sculpture. Thomas Eakins had been forced to resign from PAFA in 1886, after using a fully nude male model before female students. Grayson hired him to lecture in anatomy in January 1895, and dismissed him two months later, after Eakins again used a nude male model before a class that included female students. When Grafly took a one-year sabbatical in 1895, Grayson hired Cyrus Dallin to teach the sculpture classes. The Art Department seemed to flourish under Grayson, attracting students such as Maxfield Parrish, Elizabeth Shippen Green, Jessie Willcox Smith, Violet Oakley and Frank Schoonover. After being ordered to make severe budget cuts, Grayson tendered his resignation in December 1904. He left Drexel in June 1905, after the announcement of the dissolution of the Art Department.

Later career
Grayson was an active member of the summer artist colony at Old Lyme, Connecticut.

Honors and awards
Grayson received Honorable Mentions at the Paris Salons of 1885 and 1892.  The American Art Association awarded him the 1886 $2,000 Purchase Prize for Mid-day Dreams, and donated the painting to the Corcoran Gallery of Art. He exhibited semi-regularly in PAFA's annual exhibitions, from 1876 to 1905. PAFA awarded him the 1887 Temple Gold Medal for The Fisherman's Family, and purchased the painting for its collection.

He was a member of the Art Club of Philadelphia, and the Salmagundi Club and Century Association in New York City.

Personal
Grayson married Anna L. Steel (1867–1945) on January 21, 1902. They lived at 262 S. 15th Street, Philadelphia, and had a daughter, Helen, and a son, Clifford Jr. They retired to Old Lyme, Connecticut.

Selected works
Boat, Ahoy! (1884), Salon of 1884
The Fisherman's Family (1885), ex collection: PAFA. Honorable mention: Salon of 1885; Temple Gold Medal, PAFA, 1887
Mid-day Dreams (1886), ex collection: Corcoran Gallery of Art. $2,000 Purchase Prize, American Art Association, 1886
Rainy Day at Pont Aven (1892), ex collection: Art Institute of Chicago. Honorable mention: Salon of 1892

References

External links
Clifford Grayson, from SIRIS

1857 births
1951 deaths
Artists from Philadelphia
University of Pennsylvania alumni
Pennsylvania Academy of the Fine Arts alumni
Students of Thomas Eakins
American alumni of the École des Beaux-Arts
People from Lyme, Connecticut
19th-century American painters
20th-century American painters
Painters from Connecticut
Drexel University faculty
Members of the Salmagundi Club